Corral Hollow Creek, originally El Arroyo de los Buenos Ayres (The Creek of the Good Winds), later Buenos Ayres Creek, is a stream and tributary of the San Joaquin River, flowing through Alameda County and San Joaquin County, Central California.

Geography
The creek's headwaters are in the eastern slopes of the Diablo Range, and its confluence with the San Joaquin River is in the San Joaquin Valley.

Course

History
Named Arroyo de los Buenos Ayres or Aires by the Spanish, the creek retained this name despite the arrival of the Americans and the 49ers for some time.  The name "Arroyo Buenos Ayres" appears on the Charles Drayton Gibbes' "Map of the Southern Mines" in 1852.  However an 1857 map of California shows the canyon was now named Corral Hollow, but Buenos Aryes Creek, although anglicised, remained with its old name. By 1873 a State Geological Survey map indicated the name change was complete to Corral Hollow Creek.

References

Tributaries of the San Joaquin River
Rivers of San Joaquin County, California
Rivers of Alameda County, California
Diablo Range
Geography of the San Joaquin Valley
El Camino Viejo
Rivers of Northern California